Ignaz Johann Schönbrunner (May 1, 1835 – February 13, 1921), also known as Ignaz Schönbrunner the Elder, was an Austrian painter.

Biography
Born in Vienna in the family of a carpenter, Johann S. Schönbrunner. Studied in 1852–1858 at the Academy of Fine Arts (including with Carl Rahl), then 1858–1861 with Josef Führich and specialized in mural painting. In 1866 he was involved in the interior design of the Vienna Court Opera. 1869-1871 he created ceiling paintings in the Schottenfelder Laurenzius Church. In 1869 he joined the Austrian Artists' Society (Vienna Künstlerhaus).

References

External links
 Works by Ignaz Johann Schönbrunner, Artnet

1835 births
1921 deaths
Artists from Vienna
Austrian male painters
Austrian still life painters
19th-century Austrian painters
19th-century Austrian male artists